Gargaz (also Romanized as Gargāz; also known as Korgās and Korgāz) is a village in Saghder Rural District, Jebalbarez District, Jiroft County, Kerman Province, Iran. At the 2006 census, its population was 178, in 41 families.

References 

Populated places in Jiroft County